sabre/dav is an open source WebDAV server, developed by fruux and built in PHP.  It is an implementation of the WebDAV protocol (with extensions for CalDAV and CardDAV), providing a native PHP server implementation which operates on Apache 2 and Nginx web servers.

Features 
 Provides a complete framework for providing virtual or filesystem-based WebDAV server implementations.
 Passes the complete WebDAV Litmus test suite.
 Includes plugins for CalDAV and CardDAV support.

RFC Support 
  Obsolete WebDAV specification
  Basic and digest HTTP auth
  Access Control
  Quota and Size Properties
  Mounting WebDAV Servers
  CalDAV
  Current WebDAV specification
  Current Principal Extension
  Extended MKCOL
  HTTP PATCH
  vCard Format Specification (v4.0)
  CardDAV
  WebDAV-Sync
  Scheduling Extensions to CalDAV
  Parameter encoding for vcard/icalendar
  jCard: The JSON Format for vCard
  jCal

Compatibility
sabre/dav requires PHP version 7.1.

Supported clients
 BitKinex
 BusyCal
 Cadaver
 Cyberduck
 DavFS2
 Evolution
 Finder
 GNOME
 KDE
 NetDrive
 OpenOffice.org
 Microsoft Office
 Transmit
 WebDrive
 Windows
 WinSCP
 OS X Calendar
 OS X Address Book
 Mozilla Thunderbird (with Lightning)

See also

 Comparison of CalDAV and CardDAV implementations
 fruux, the company behind sabre/dav

References

External links
 
 
 Other open source projects powered by fruux

Calendaring software
Calendaring standards
Free calendaring software